Kitna Satatay Ho is a 2015 Pakistani romantic drama serial. It aired on Hum TV. The series was directed by Mazhar Moin, written by Fasih Bari Khan, and produced by Momina Duraid. The drama aired Sunday evenings. The show ended on 22 November 2015.

Plot
A typical household story, where sisters-in-law are always trying to bring each other down. The story revolves around family politics and greed.

Cast

 Arij Fatyma as Amna
 Adnan Siddiqui as Hassan
 Rubina Ashraf as Bhabhi
 Usman Peerzada as Zubair
 Kiran Tabeir as Rabia
 Raheela Agha as Nuzhat
 Huma Nawab as Hammad's aunt
 Rubina Ashraf as Rabia's mother
 Junaid Akhtar as Hamaad

References

External links
 Official Hum Tv Website

Hum TV original programming
Urdu-language television shows
Pakistani drama television series
2015 Pakistani television series debuts
2014 Pakistani television series endings